Abdul Alim Khan (1950–1993) was born in a small village called Badi which comes under Sitapur, Lucknow, Uttar Pradesh on 26 January 1950 in Uttar Pradesh, India.  He was PhD. in Urdu Literature and wrote for publications like Inquilab Times and Urdu times.

Political career
Alim Khan was drawn to the Janata party in his early days as a teenager. Later in the period from 1975 to 1977, Alim Khan was arrested along with several other opposition leaders during the Internal Emergency imposed by Prime Minister Indira Gandhi of the Indian National Congress party. His ability to connect with crowd combined with his exceptional oratory skills made him the most sought out leader and was hailed as a crowd puller. He actively participated in the activities of the Janata Party.

Alim Khan who was termed as Vajpayee's protégé then joined many of his Bharatiya Jana Sangh and Rashtriya Swayamsewak Sangh colleagues, and become the Party general Secretary in Maharashtra along with his friends Pramod Mahajan and Gopinath Munde in the newly formed Bharatiya Janata Party (BJP).

His activism and relentless work in Bharatiya Janata Party led him to lead various gatherings across the country.

As a Bharatiya Janata Party Muslim leader he was a permanent fixture and crowd puller on the various rath yatra's held by the Bharatiya Janata Party across country under the leadership of L K Advani and was also present in Ayodhaya during the Babri Masjid movement.

Khan saheb as he was fondly called was also highly respected amongst allies like Shiv Sena as well as amongst the rival political parties.

Known to be the man behind the scenes, he had to yield in to party pressure to contests and gave a tough fight in the Chinchpokli constituency in Legislative assembly.

His untimely death on 5 June 1993 at young age of 43 stunned many and created a vacuum which was hard to fill. His funeral procession held in Santacruz, Mumbai saw a sea of people including politicians across party lines and business houses and included Stalwarts like Party President Mr L K Advani, Pramod Mahajan, Sikandar Bhakt, Gopinath Munde, Murli Manohar Joshi, Prakash Javdekar, Nitin Gadkari, Prakash Mehta, MP Lodha, Shatrughan Sinha, Bhagvatji, Vinod Tawde, Madhu Chavan etc.

References

1950 births
1993 deaths
Bharatiya Janata Party politicians from Uttar Pradesh